ICBS B.C. was a Greek professional basketball team that was founded in 1993. The team was based in the Oraiokastro district of Thessaloniki, Greece. During its existence, the club competed in the Greek 2nd Division.

History
The club was promoted up through 6 divisions in 6 consecutive years, that included them winning the Greek EKASTH 5th Division in 1998, and the Greek 4th Division in 1999. The club eventually went on to play in the Greek 2nd Division. In 2009, the club merged with Perama/Ermis, and formed the new club under the name of Peramatos Ermis

Championships
Greek Under-19 Champion: (1996)
Greek EKASTH Division Champion: (1998)
Greek C League Champion: (1999)

Notable players

 Ioannis Demertzis
 Sakis Karidas
 Christos Petrodimopoulos
 Ioannis Psathas
 Ioannis Sioutis
 Thodoris Zaras

Head coaches
 Dinos Kalampakos

Junior teams
In 1996, the club's under-18 age team won the Greek Under-18 national championship.

External links
ICBS.gr website 
Eurobasket.com Team Profile

Basketball teams in Greece
Sports clubs established in 1993